Liberace: Behind the Music is a 1988 Canadian-American made-for-television biographical film. It is an "unofficial" biopic drama on the life and death of Władziu Valentino Liberace, who went from a humble working-class background to become a famous American pianist and vocalist. Known as "Liberace", he became the highest paid entertainer in the world, while embracing a lifestyle of flamboyant excess. The film first aired less than two years after his death, in the United States, as a CBS Sunday Movie.

Description
The modest-length production (97 minutes) traces Liberace's life, as played by Canadian actor Victor Garber, from his humble beginnings in a Milwaukee suburb, through his major life highs and lows, culminating with the highly publicized palimony lawsuit filed against him by his former limo driver and alleged live-in boyfriend of five years, Scott Thorson (played by Michael Dolan), and his failing health, ending with his death at age 67 on February 4, 1987, from AIDS complications.

The film highlighted an early casting appearance of then 20-year-old Shawn Levy as Glenn, a post-Thorson acquaintance of Liberace's through the pianist's final days.

The film was directed by Emmy Award-winning David Greene. Credit for technical advisor is given to long-time Liberace friend and agent Seymour Heller (portrayed in the film by Saul Rubinek).

Film clips from Liberace's actual stage appearances are interspersed in the storyline.

Liberace: Behind the Music was broadcast one week after the ABC biopic production Liberace (1988), starring Andrew Robinson in the lead, and with a script holding to a point of view that Liberace was heterosexual. Liberace: Behind the Music, however, acknowledged his homosexuality.

Plot
Wladiziu Valentino Liberace, a gifted classical pianist fueled by poverty, was already playing with the Chicago Symphony Orchestra at the age of 17.  Through a variety of his highs and lows, chaptered in TV-style format, Liberace's life from his early years through his death are chronicled with the struggle of keeping his sexuality hidden from the public.

Cast
 Victor Garber as Liberace
 Saul Rubinek as Seymour Heller
 Michael Dolan as Scott Thorson
 Maureen Stapleton as Frances Liberace
 Shawn Levy as Glenn
 Michael Wilkes as George Liberace
 Macha Grenon as Joanne
 George Touliatos as Salvatore Liberace
 Joan Heney as Serious Lady
 Andrew Nichols as Teenager
 Paul Hipp as Elvis Presley
 Frances Hyland as Florence Bettray Kelly
 Stephen Watts as Jimmy
 Louis Giambalvo as Eddie
 Rochelle Bruneau as George's Girl

Home media

Liberace: Behind the Music is available on DVD from Kushner-Locke, distributed through Tango Entertainment.

See also
 Behind the Candelabra, another biopic, stars Michael Douglas as Liberace and Matt Damon as Thorson; it aired on the HBO television network on May 26, 2013.

References

External links
 
 Liberace: Behind the Music Trailer

1988 television films
1988 films
1988 LGBT-related films
1980s biographical films
CBS network films
American LGBT-related films
Biographical films about musicians
Cultural depictions of Liberace
Cultural depictions of Elvis Presley
Films directed by David Greene
The Kushner-Locke Company films
1980s American films